Bertolanius is a genus of tardigrades belonging to the family Eohypsibiidae.

The species of this genus are found in Europe and Northern America.

Species:

 Bertolanius birnae 
 Bertolanius mahunkai 
 Bertolanius markevichi 
 Bertolanius nebulosus 
 Bertolanius portucalensis 
 Bertolanius smreczinskii 
 Bertolanius volubilis 
 Bertolanius weglarskae

References

Parachela (tardigrade)
Tardigrade genera